Scarred, past tense of scar, may refer to:

Books
 Scarred: Experiments with Violence in Gujarat, a 2006 Indian non-fiction book by Dionne Bunsha
 Scarred, by Monica Dickens

Music
 The Scarred, a punk rock band from Anaheim, California formed in 2003
 Scarred (album), a live album by English musician Gary Numan released in 2003
 Scarred (EP), a 2010 EP by aggrotech band Combichrist
 "Scarred", a song by Dream Theater from Awake
 "Scarred", a song by Iced Earth from The Dark Saga
 "Scarred", a song by Luther Campbell from Uncle Luke

Film and television
 Scarred (film), a 1984 independent film
 Scarred (TV series), a program that debuted on MTV in 2007, which featured people being injured during stunts

Other uses
 Scarred tree, a tree which has had bark removed by indigenous Australians for the creation of canoes, shelters, shields and containers

See also
 Scar (disambiguation)
 SCAR (disambiguation)
 SCARS (disambiguation)